The following lists events that happened during 1929 in New Zealand.

Population
 Estimated population as of 31 December: 1,486,100
 Increase since previous 31 December 1928: 18,700 (1.27%)
 Males per 100 females: 104.1

Incumbents

Regal and viceregal
Head of state – George V
Governor-General – General Sir Charles Fergusson Bt GCMG KCB DSO MVO

Government
The 23rd New Zealand Parliament continued.
Speaker of the House – Charles Statham (Independent)
Prime Minister – TBD
Deputy Prime Minister – TBD
Minister of Finance – Joseph Ward (United)
Minister of Foreign Affairs – TBD
Chief Justice – Sir Charles Skerrett then Sir Michael Myers

Parliamentary opposition
 Leader of the Opposition – Gordon Coates (Reform)

Main centre leaders
Mayor of Auckland – George Baildon
Mayor of Wellington – George Troup
Mayor of Christchurch – John Archer
Mayor of Dunedin –  William Taverner, succeeded by Robert Black

Events 
 9 March: 1929 Arthur's Pass earthquake: A quake of Richter Magnitude 7.1 in the Arthur's Pass area causes extensive landslips and damage to roads and railways. There are no injuries.
 17 June: 1929 Murchison earthquake: An earthquake of surface wave magnitude 7.8 causes the deaths of 17 people and causes great damage in Murchison and surrounding areas
 29 October: Black Tuesday. Wall Street crash triggers the 10-year Great Depression.

Arts and literature

See 1929 in art, 1929 in literature, :Category:1929 books

Music

See: 1929 in music

Radio

See: Public broadcasting in New Zealand

Film

See: :Category:1929 film awards, 1929 in film, List of New Zealand feature films, Cinema of New Zealand, :Category:1929 films

Sport

Badminton
National Champions
Men's singles: J. Southon
Women's singles: A. Ellett
Men's doubles: T. Kelly and J. McLean
Women's doubles: E. Hetley and F. Harvey
Mixed doubles: T. Kelly and A. Ellett

Chess
The 38th National Chess Championship was held in Wellington, and was won by J.A. Erskine of Melbourne.

Golf
 The 19th New Zealand Open championship was won by Andrew Shaw.
 The 33rd National Amateur Championships were held in Wanganui
 Men: Sloan Morpeth (Maungakiekie) – 3rd title
 Women: Mrs P.L. Dodgshun (Dunedin).

Horse racing

Harness racing
 New Zealand Trotting Cup – Peter Bingen (2nd win)
 Auckland Trotting Cup – Gold Jacket (2nd win)

Thoroughbred racing
 New Zealand Cup – Chide
 Avondale Gold Cup – Historic
 Auckland Cup – Concentrate
 Wellington Cup – Vertigern
 New Zealand Derby – Honour

Lawn bowls
The national outdoor lawn bowls championships are held in Wellington.
 Men's singles champion – A.R. Coltman (Carlton Bowling Club)
 Men's pair champions – A.G. Kinvig, F. Laurenson (skip) (Linwood Bowling Club)
 Men's fours champions – C.E. Hardley, F. Needham, I. Clarke, Bill Bremner (skip) (West End Bowling Club, Auckland)

Rugby
:Category:Rugby union in New Zealand, :Category:All Blacks
 Ranfurly Shield

Rugby league
New Zealand national rugby league team

Soccer
 1929 Chatham Cup won by Tramways (Auckland)
 Provincial league champions:
	Auckland:	Tramways
	Canterbury:	Thistle
	Hawke's Bay:	Napier YMCA
	Nelson:	Thistle
	Otago:	Seacliff
	South Canterbury:	Albion Rovers
	Southland:	Corinthians
	Taranaki:	Stratford
	Waikato:	Claudelands Rovers
	Wanganui:	Thistle
	Wellington:	Diamond

Births

January
 7 January – Peter Bartlett, architect and academic (died 2019)
 10 January – Grahame Jarratt, rower (died 2011)
 13 January – James Beal, boxer (died 1996)
 19 January – Brian Steele, rugby union player
 24 January – Stuart Jones, cricketer (died 2015)

February
 6 February
 Maurice Dixon, rugby union player (died 2004)
 Noel Hilliard, author and novelist (died 1996)
 Colin Murdoch, pharmacist, veterinarian, inventor (died 2008)
 12 February – Kevin Dwyer, cricketer (died 2020)
 14 February
 Noel Dellow, cricketer (died 2021)
 Jenny King, librarian (died 2021)
 16 February – Venn Young, politician (died 1993)

March
 6 March
 Ian Irvine, rugby union player, disability rights advocate (died 2013)
 Ronald Trubuhovich, medical practitioner, critical care specialist 
 7 March
 Ian McKay, jurist (died 2014)
 Tom Weal, politician (died 2016)
 9 March – Les Rackley, boxing trainer (died 2021)
 12 March – William Liley, perinatal physiologist (died 1983)
 21 March
 Lesley Rowe, athlete (died 2011)
 Iritana Tāwhiwhirangi, Māori language advocate
 22 March – Dennis Copps, cricket umpire (died 2020)
 24 March
 Hugh Templeton, diplomat, politician
 Ian Templeton, journalist, writer
 25 March – Allan Wright, farmer and businessman (died 2022)
 26 March – Joye Evans, guiding leader  (died 2021)
 27 March
 Shona McFarlane, artist, writer, broadcaster (died 2001)
 Hallard White, rugby union player, coach and administrator (died 2016)

April
 1 April – Te Huirangi Waikerepuru, Māori language advocate, trade unionist (died 2020)
 2 April – Robert Ellis, artist (died 2021)
 6 April – Pat Goodman, businessman, philanthropist (died 2017)
 9 April
 Aubrey Begg, politician (died 1988)
 Fred Hollows, eye surgeon (died 1993)
 Denford McDonald, businessman (died 2020)
 12 April – Ponty Reid, rugby union player (died 1994)
 21 April
 Bevin Hough, rugby league player, field athlete (died 2019)
 Ross Smith, rugby union player (died 2002)
 25 April – Yvette Williams, athlete (died 2019)
 30 April – Keith Smith, cricketer (died 2016)

May
 2 May – Graham Gedye, cricketer (died 2014)
 10 May – Miles Warren, architect (died 2022)
 15 May – Angela Annabell, musicologist (died 2000)
 19 May – Mavis Rivers, jazz singer (died 1992)
 26 May – Fraser Bergersen, plant biologist (died 2011)
 31 May – Thelma Turner, netball player

June
 3 June – Les Lock, racing cyclist (died 2003)
 6 June – June Sutor, crystallographer (died 1990)
 7 June – Colin Graham, cricketer (died 2020)
 30 June
 Ed Dolejs, softball coach (died 2019)
 David Perry, cricketer (died 2007)

July
 2 July – Hugh Morris, businessman (died 2010)
 8 July – Vern Bakalich, rugby league player (died 2015)
 18 July – Colin Moyle, politician
 23 July – Johnny Cooper, rock and roll musician (died 2014)

August
 1 August – Phyllis Guthardt, Methodist minister, university chancellor
 5 August
 Harry Atkinson, physicist and science administrator (died 2018)
 Arthur Woods, rugby union player (died 2015)
 10 August
 Eric Dunn, cricketer
 Brian Pickworth, fencer (died 2020)
 Ross Wightman, rugby union player (died 2012)
 19 August – David Levene, businessman, philanthropist (died 2021)
 23 August – Bob Bell, politician (died 2011)
 24 August – Oliver Jessel, businessman (died 2017)
 25 August – John Hippolite, political activist (died 1993)
 29 August – Helen Hughes, scientist

September
 1 September – Indianapolis, Standardbred racehorse
 3 September – Steve Rickard, professional wrestler, trainer and promoter (died 2015)
 4 September – Howard Charles Clark, chemist, university administrator
 5 September – Margaret Loutit, microbiologist (died 2020)
 9 September
 Graham Avery, racing cyclist (died 2015)
 Pat Booth, journalist (died 2018)
 19 September – Phil Bygrave, field hockey player (died 2012)
 26 September – Tim Raphael, Anglican clergyman (died 2016)
 28 September – Bill Hunt, alpine skier (died 2009)
 30 September – Yvonne du Fresne, writer (died 2011)

October
 8 October – Ron Crocombe, Pacific studies academic (died 2009)
 9 October – Peter Button, helicopter pilot (died 1987)
 11 October
 Annette Baier, philosopher (died 2012)
 Augusta Wallace, jurist (died 2008)
 20 October
 Mary Earle, food technologist (died 2021)
 William Gough, cricketer (died 1978)
 28 October – Tom Puna, cricketer (died 1996)

November
 8 November – Trevor McMahon, cricketer
 13 November – Brian Sorenson, cricketer (died 2009)
 16 November – Bill Clark, rugby union player (died 2010)
 18 November – Bill Alington, architect
 19 November – Basil Meeking, Roman Catholic bishop (died 2020)
 20 November – Pat Kelly, trade unionist (died 2004)
 23 November – Felix Donnelly, Roman Catholic priest, social activist, writer, broadcaster (died 2019)
 26 November – Brian Coote, legal academic (died 2019)
 28 November – Ray Hitchcock, cricketer, racehorse breeder (died 2019)

December
 7 December – John Hotop, rugby union player (died 2015)
 14 December – Ron Jarden, rugby union player, sharebroker (died 1977)
 15 December – Noel Scott, politician (died 2018)
 19 December – Michael Fowler, architect, politician (died 2022)
 26 December – Margaret Lawlor-Bartlett, artist
 27 December – Elizabeth Edgar, botanist (died 2019)

Undated
 Cuddle, Thoroughbred racehorse
 Jacqueline Fahey, painter, writer
 Brian McMahon, venereologist, army officer
 Alistair Paterson, writer, poet
 Alison Quentin-Baxter, lawyer
 Renée Taylor, feminist writer and playwright

Deaths

January–March
 21 January – Alexander William Bickerton, chemistry academic (born 1842)
 7 February – Sir Douglas Maclean, farmer, politician (born 1852)
 13 February – Sir Charles Skerrett, jurist (born 1863)
 28 February – George Allen, architect, surveyor, tourist guide (born 1837)
 7 March – Henare Uru, politician (born 1872)
 11 March – Harry Diddams, politician (born 1864)
 23 March – Niniwa Heremaia, editor, Ngāti Kahungunu leader (born 1854)
 26 March – Waitaoro, Ngāti Tama leader (born 1848)

April–June
 7 April – Alfred Whitehouse, motion picture exhibitor and producer (born 1856)
 19 April – Alfred Fitchett, Anglican clergyman (born 1836)
 3 May
 Charles Mackay, lawyer, politician, mayor of Wanganui (1906–1920) (born 1875)
 Sir James Wilson, politician (born 1849)
 5 May – Maria Williams, schoolteacher (born 1839)
 11 May – John Kissling, cricketer (born 1868)
 19 June – Margaret Gardner, farmer, flour mill owner (born 1844)
 20 June – Ann Wimperis, watercolour artist (born 1844)
 24 June – Tupu Atanatiu Taingakawa Te Waharoa, Ngāti Hauā and Kīngitanga leader (born 1844)
 27 June – Maata Te Taiawatea Rangitukehu, Ngāti Awa and Tuhourangi leader (born 1848)

July–September
 10 July – James Arnold, trade unionist, politician (born 1859)
 12 July – Alex Lithgow, composer and bandleader (born 1870)
 24 July – Albert Bates, architect (born 1862)
 15 August – Carl Dahl, businessman, importer, community leader (born 1856)
 20 August – Arnold Williams, cricketer (born 1870)
 29 August – Arthur Riley, artist, educationalist, businessman (born 1860)
 30 August – Sarah Cryer, farmer, community leader (born 1848)
 31 August – Henry Baigent, timber miller, politician (born 1844)
 1 September – Mary Gibson, schoolteacher (born 1864)
 5 September – Mariano Vella, seaman, fisherman, farmer (born 1855)
 8 September – Robert Wynn Williams, politician (born 1864)
 18 September – John Bollons, mariner, naturalist, ethnographer (born 1862)
 23 September – Sir George Fenwick, newspaper editor and proprietor (born 1847)
 27 September – Nisbet McRobie, rugby union player, newspaper proprietor, politician (born 1872)

October–December
 25 October – Charles Chilton, zoologist (born 1860)
 13 November – Richard Henry, conservationist (born 1845)
 29 November – Albert Turnbull, cricketer (born 1866)
 7 December – Sir John Findlay, politician (born 1862)
 9 December – Henry Cleary, Roman Catholic bishop (born 1859)
 19 December – William Maslin, politician (born 1850)
 28 December – Mads Christensen, Lutheran pastor (born 1856)
 30 December – Charles Tuke, cricketer (born 1858)

See also
History of New Zealand
List of years in New Zealand
Military history of New Zealand
Timeline of New Zealand history
Timeline of New Zealand's links with Antarctica
Timeline of the New Zealand environment

References

External links

 
Years of the 20th century in New Zealand